Trifurcula magna is a moth of the family Nepticulidae. It was described by A. and Z. Laštuvka in 1997. It was described from Devinska Kobyla, Slovakia, but is also known from France and Hungary.

References

Nepticulidae
Moths of Europe
Moths described in 1997